Samuel W. Greenhouse (January 13, 1918 – September 29, 2000) was an American statistician who helped to pioneer the use of statistics in epidemiology. With Seymour Geisser, he developed the Greenhouse–Geisser correction, which is now widely used in the analysis of variance to correct for violations of the assumption of compound symmetry.

Academic career
Greenhouse was one of several founding statisticians at the National Institutes of Health (NIH), where, with Jerome Cornfield, Jacob Lieberman, Nathan Mantel, and Marvin Schneiderman, he co-founded the first biometry group in the National Cancer Institute in 1948. In 1954, Greenhouse became head of the theoretical statistics and applied mathematics section at the National Institute of Mental Health. He became chief of the National Institute of Child Health and Human Development's epidemiology and biometry branch in 1966, and continued to work there until 1974, when he joined the faculty of George Washington University (GWU). He chaired the GWU department of statistics twice: in 1976–1979 and in 1985–1986. He retired from the GWU faculty in 1988, whereupon he was named an emeritus professor there.

Honors and awards
Greenhouse was a fellow of the American Statistical Association, the Institute of Mathematical Statistics, the American Association for the Advancement of Science, and the Royal Statistical Society. He was also an elected member of the International Statistical Institute, a fellow of the American College of Epidemiology, and a fellow of the American Heart Association's Council of Epidemiology.

References

Further reading

1918 births
2000 deaths
American statisticians
Biostatisticians
Fellows of the American Statistical Association
Scientists from New York City
National Institutes of Health faculty
City College of New York alumni
Columbian College of Arts and Sciences alumni
George Washington University faculty
American epidemiologists
Fellows of the Institute of Mathematical Statistics
Fellows of the American Association for the Advancement of Science
Fellows of the Royal Statistical Society
Elected Members of the International Statistical Institute
Deaths from cancer in Maryland